Pamela P. Resor (born 1942) is an American politician who was the Massachusetts State Senator for the Middlesex & Worcester District from her election in 1999 to her retirement in 2009.

Resor attended Smith College in the 1960s. In 1978 she was President of the League of Women Voters. From 1981 to 1987 she was a member of the Acton, Massachusetts board of selectmen.

She was elected to the Massachusetts House of Representatives in 1990 and then was elected to the Massachusetts Senate in a special election in 1999. She served as the Senate Chair of the Joint Committee on Environment, Natural Resources, and Agriculture and the Vice Chair of the Senate Committee on Global Warming and Climate Change.

In early February 2008, Resor announced that she would retire from the Massachusetts Senate at the end of her term. She endorsed Jamie Eldridge, and he succeeded her.

References

1942 births
Living people
Massachusetts state senators
Members of the Massachusetts House of Representatives
People from Acton, Massachusetts
Smith College alumni
Women state legislators in Massachusetts
21st-century American women